Carl L. Alsberg (April 2, 1877 – October 31, 1940) was an American chemist who served as Commissioner of Food and Drugs from 1912 to 1921. Carl Lucas Alsberg was born to a secular German-Jewish family, the oldest of four children. His father Meinhard, a chemist who immigrated to the U.S. from Germany in 1865, was a founder of the American Chemical Society. Carl Alsberg attended Columbia University, where he founded a literary magazine, The Morningside. He graduated from Columbia College in 1896. 

After teaching at Harvard University, Alsberg went to work for the U.S. government in 1908, and within a few years was appointed the Chief of the United States Bureau of Chemistry, which would be renamed the Food and Drug Administration. In that role, Alsberg pursued an investigation into pepper adulteration at McCormick & Company which resulted in a fine and a court order that the company must label its product as "ground black pepper containing from 10 percent to 28 percent added pepper shells". Alsberg also investigated Monsanto's use of saccharin and the amount of caffeine in Coca-Cola.

In 1921, Alsberg resigned from the Bureau of Chemistry and co-founded Stanford University's Food Research Institute.

In 1937, he took a position at the University of California, Berkeley. In 1940, after visiting family in New York, Alsberg became ill with pneumonia on the train trip back to California and died in the hospital on October 31.

References

1877 births
1940 deaths
American food chemists
Commissioners of the Food and Drug Administration
Taft administration personnel
Woodrow Wilson administration personnel
Harding administration personnel

Columbia College (New York) alumni